Brian Grace (born 30 December 1945) is an Australian cricketer. He played in seven first-class matches for Queensland between 1967 and 1972.

See also
 List of Queensland first-class cricketers

References

External links
 

1945 births
Living people
Australian cricketers
Queensland cricketers
Cricketers from Brisbane